Dream High 2 is a 2012 South Korean television series starring Kang So-ra, Jay B, Jeong Jin-woon, Park Ji-yeon, Hyolyn, and Park Seo-joon. It aired on KBS2 from January 30 to March 20, 2012, on Mondays and Tuesdays at 22:00 (KST). Like its prequel, it has 16 episodes but was less successful, only averaging single-digit audience ratings.

Synopsis
Like its predecessor Dream High, it follows a group of students at the Kirin High School of Art stars who pursue their dream of becoming K-pop stars. However, it has a slight difference in terms of plot with new set of student casts.

After going into financial bankruptcy, Kirin High School is taken over by Oz Entertainment. The company then transfers its own young trainees to circumvent a law requiring underage entertainers to study for a set amount of time. Then, competition brews between the troubled students at Kirin High and the newly transferred Oz Entertainment trainees.

Although Shin Hae-sung (Kang So-ra) enters Kirin High School with a high exam score, she has no talent in singing. She meets and befriends fellow students, Jin Yoo-jin (Jung Jin-woon) and JB. Yoo-jin, who originally got into the entertainment industry as a child actor, is now troubled by his dreams of becoming a rock star as he tries to cope with the pain of his parents' divorce. JB, a member of a famous group I:dn (Eden), develops feelings for Hae-sung and dates her later on.

Ri-an (Jiyeon), a member of a famous girl group called HershE, chases after JB, who was once her boyfriend. Meanwhile, Yoo-jin, who also likes Hae-sung, tries to separate the couple with Ri-an. Later on, Ri-an and Yoo-jin give up and remain close friends.

Hae-sung leaves for the US and 8 years after the graduation it is revealed that now she is a famous composer and director, JB, due to his leg injury, gives up on his dream of being a dancer and ends up as a music producer, Ri-an becomes a Hallyu idol, and Yoo-jin becomes a rock music teacher at Kirin High School by day and a rocker by night.

All of them have a reunion performance on stage for Kirin High School's 17 years anniversary.

Cast

Main
 Kang So-ra as Shin Hae-sung
 Park Ji-yeon as Ri-an / Lee Ji-kyung
 Jay B as JB / Jang Woo-jae
 Jeong Jin-woon as Jin Yoo-jin
 Hyolyn as Na-na / Kim Jae-hee
 Park Seo-joon as Lee Si-woo

Supporting

Students in Kirin High School
 Park Jin-young as Jung Ui-bong
 Yoo So-young as Park Soon-dong
 Kim Jisoo as Park Hong-joo
 Jung Yeon-joo as Lee Seul
 Ailee as Ailee

Teachers in Kirin High School
 Park Jin-young as Yang Jin-man (English teacher)
 Kwon Hae-hyo as Joo Jung-wan (principal)
 Kim Jung-tae as Lee Kang-chul (president)
 Choi Yeo-jin as Ahn Tae-yeon (vocal teacher)
 Kahi as Hyun Ji-soo (dance teacher)

Others
 Yoon Hee-seok as Shin Jae-in
 Hwang Mi-sun as Ri-an's mother
 Jung Kyu-soo as Hae-sung's father
 Roh Jeong-eui as Shin Hae-pung (Hae-sung's sister)
 Jo Jung-eun as teen Shin Hae-pung (Ep. 16)

Special appearances
 Kim Soo-hyun as actor playing Song Sam-dong (Ep. 1)
 Lee Ji-eun as Kim Pil-sook (Ep. 1)
 Mark Tuan as I:dn backup dancer (Ep. 1)
 Young K as I:dn backup dancer (Ep. 1)
 Lee Chung-mi as Ga-yeong
 Park Sungjun as I:dn backup dancer (Ep. 1)
 Toxic as band performing with Yoo-jin in Hongdae (Ep. 1 & 2)
 Nayeon as Jung Ui-bong's dance partner (Ep. 2)
 Myname as OZ Entertainment idol group (Ep. 2)
 Boyfriend as themselves (Ep. 2)
 Psy as trainer coach (Ep. 5 & 6)
 Kim Seon-nyeo as Jin Yoo-jin's mother (Ep. 8, 12–16)
 Park Ye-eun as herself (Ep. 9)
 miss A as themselves (Ep. 15)
 Park Jin-young as himself (Ep. 16)

Original soundtrack

Background
"Falling" is the first part of the drama's soundtrack and was featured in the first episode of the drama. Park Jin-young was once again involved in composing, writing and interpreting the soundtrack of the drama.

The track "Falling" is slow tempo with beautiful guitar melody. It has gained a lot of popular response sweeping music charts since its release. Ranking first, second and third on real time charts. The song is available on digital music portals such as Melon, Soribada, Bugs and Mnet. The rest of the soundtrack will include more beautiful melodies reflecting character stories, struggles and dreams in the drama.

Songs performed

 HerShe: Superstar (ep. 1)
 Eden: New Dreaming (ep. 1)
 Hong-joo: Tell Me Your Wish – Girls' Generation (ep. 1)
 Yoo-jin: You Walking Towards Me – Jinwoon (ep. 1)
 All cast: Roly Poly – T-ara (ep. 2)
 Hong-joo, Ui-bong: I Am the Best – 2NE1 (ep. 2)
 Nana, Ailee: Top Girl – G.NA (ep. 2)
 All cast: Entertainer – Psy (ep. 2)
 TOXIC: New Dreaming (ep. 2)
 Nana, Hong-joo: Destiny – Jeon Byung-uk (ep. 3)
 Yoo-jin: You Walking Towards Me – Jinwoon (ep. 3)
 Tae-yeon: That Woman – Baek Ji-young (ep. 4)
 Jin-man: Mm Mm Mm – Park Jin-young (ep. 4)
 Hae-sung: Wishing on a Star – Wonder Girls (ep. 4)
 Nana, Hong-joo: Covered Up Road – Yoo Jae-ha (ep. 4)
 Ailee: Please (ep. 5)
 Rian: Wishing on a Star – Wonder Girls (ep. 5)
 Nana, Hong-joo: Covered Up Road – Yoo Jae-ha (ep. 5)
 Yoo-jin, JB: Beautiful Dance – Bye Bye Sea (ep. 5)
 Yoo-jin: Starlight Is Falling – Bye Bye Sea (ep. 5)
 Yoo-jin, Rian, Hong-joo and the band: Superstar – Lee Han-chul (ep. 6)
 Hong-joo: Na This Time (ep. 6)
 Hae-sung: Hello to Myself – Yeeun (ep. 6)
 Rian, Yoo-jin: Hello to Myself – Yeeun (ep. 7)
 JB: When I Can't Sing – Seven (ep. 8)
 Nana, Ji-soo: I'm in Love – Narsha (ep. 8)
 Yeeun: Hello to Myself – Yeeun (ep. 9)
 Hong-joo, Seul: We Are the B (ep. 9)
 Yoo-jin, Hae-sung, Ui-bong, Soon-dong, Hong-joo, Seul – We Are the B (ep. 9)
 Ailee: On Rainy Days – BEAST (ep. 10)
 JB, Si-woo: In the Rain – John Park (ep. 10)
 JB, Si-woo, Ailee, Nana: Love Rain – Kim Tae-woo (ep. 10)
 Hong-joo: This Song – 2AM (ep. 10)
 JB, Si-woo, Ailee, Rian: One Candle – g.o.d (ep. 10)
 JB, Si-woo, Ailee, Rian: One Candle – g.o.d (ep. 11)
 JB: Marshmallow – IU (ep. 11)
 Nana, Hong-joo: My Heart Will Go On – Celine Dion (ep. 12)
 Ui-bong, Ailee: Summer Nights – Grease (ep. 12)
 JB, Hae-sung: Bobbed Hair – Cho Young Pil (ep. 12)
 Yoo-jin, Rian: Romeo & Juliet – Clazziquai (ep. 12)
 Nana: Isn't She Lovely – Stevie Wonder (ep. 13)
 Ui-bong: I Have a Girl – Park Jin-young (ep. 13)
 Seul: How Dare You – Sistar (ep. 13)
 Ui-bong: Dirty Cash – Big Bang (ep. 13)
 Nana, Hong-joo: Good Day – Jo Sungmo (ep. 14)
 Seul: Dirty Cash – BigBang (ep. 14)
 Ui-bong, Seul: Balloons – TVXQ (ep. 14)
 JB, Rian: Together (ep. 14)
 Hong-joo: Sunflower (ep. 15)
 Yoo-jin: Sorry – Jinwoon (ep. 15)
 JB: We Are the B (ep. 15)
 Rian: Day After Day (ep. 16)
 JB, Yoo-jin, Rian, Nana, Si-woo, Ailee, Ui-bong, Hong-joo: Dream High – Dream High (ep. 16)

Ratings
In this table,  represent the lowest ratings and  represent the highest ratings.

Awards and nominations

Listicles

International broadcast

Streaming platforms

Notes

References

External links
 
 

2012 South Korean television series debuts
2012 South Korean television series endings
South Korean musical television series
South Korean teen dramas
South Korean romance television series
Korean Broadcasting System television dramas
Korean-language television shows
Sequel television series
Television series by CJ E&M
Television series by JYP Entertainment
Television series by KeyEast
2012 South Korean television seasons
Dream High
Television series about teenagers
South Korean high school television series